Dipolydora is a genus of polychaetes belonging to the family Spionidae.

The genus has cosmopolitan distribution.

Species:

Dipolydora aciculata 
Dipolydora akaina 
Dipolydora alborectalis 
Dipolydora anatentaculata 
Dipolydora antonbruunae 
Dipolydora armata 
Dipolydora barbilla 
Dipolydora bidentata 
Dipolydora bifurcata 
Dipolydora blakei 
Dipolydora capensis 
Dipolydora cardalia 
Dipolydora carunculata 
Dipolydora caulleryi 
Dipolydora coeca 
Dipolydora commensalis 
Dipolydora concharum 
Dipolydora contoyensis 
Dipolydora elegantissima 
Dipolydora flava 
Dipolydora giardi 
Dipolydora goreensis 
Dipolydora hartmanae 
Dipolydora huelma 
Dipolydora langerhansi 
Dipolydora magellanica 
Dipolydora melanopalpa 
Dipolydora normalis 
Dipolydora notialis 
Dipolydora paracaulleryi 
Dipolydora peristomialis 
Dipolydora pilikia 
Dipolydora pilocollaris 
Dipolydora protuberata 
Dipolydora quadrilobata 
Dipolydora saintjosephi 
Dipolydora socialis 
Dipolydora tentaculata 
Dipolydora tetrabranchia 
Dipolydora tridenticulata 
Dipolydora trilobata 
Dipolydora vulcanica

References

Canalipalpata
Annelid genera